A digital media player is a home entertainment consumer electronics device that can connect to a home network to stream digital media (such as music, pictures, or video).

Standalone streaming players

This list does not include discontinued or legacy media players.

Gaming systems

Content agreements

Internet video services

US television services

NOTE: These tables are not comprehensive or all inclusive; some pay-TV services may not have contracts with certain networks or refuse to serve networks on certain platforms.

See also 
 Digital media player
 List of smart TV platforms
 List of microconsoles
 Home theater PC

References 

.
Technological comparisons
Consumer electronics
Media players
Multimedia
Networking hardware
Television technology